Afrosyleter is a genus of beetles in the family Carabidae, containing the following species:

 Afrosyleter congoensis (Burgeon, 1935)
 Afrosyleter ituricus P. Basilewsky, 1959
 Afrosyleter leleupi P. Basilewsky, 1959
 Afrosyleter pauliani P. Basilewsky, 1959
 Afrosyleter reticulatus P. Basilewsky, 1962
 Afrosyleter serrulatus P. Basilewsky, 1959

References

Scaritinae